Rachel Bernstein is a video game designer and developer based in San Francisco, USA.

Education
Bernstein graduated from Princeton University with a degree in electrical engineering and computer science in 1987.

Career
From 1987 to 1994, Bernstein worked as a software engineer. In 1994, she co-founded the company Frog City Software with the brothers Bill and Ted Spieth. Bernstein wrote the code and assembled a development team for a prototype that later became the game Imperialism. The project received funding from Strategic Simulations in 1995, with president Chuck Kroegel describing it as, 'the thinking man's Civilisation'. Imperialism was released in 1997 and has an IGN community rating of 7.8/10. Bernstein oversaw the development of games Imperialism II and Trade Empires, for which she wrote a detailed project breakdown. In 2003, Bernstein sold Frog City to Take-Two Interactive, but continued to run the company as Take-Two's subsidiary.

Bernstein joined Electronic Arts in 2007 and became an executive producer for Maxis, overseeing the development of the Wii version of MySims Agents (2009) and The Sims Medieval (2011).

Since 2013, Bernstein has served as an executive producer at Google for the Android Play Studio.

She has been a speaker at South by Southwest, TEDxYouth, and the 2016 Astra S.T.E.A.M. Summit in San Francisco.

References

Video game developers
American software engineers
American video game designers
Women video game developers
Princeton University School of Engineering and Applied Science alumni
Living people
Year of birth missing (living people)
Place of birth missing (living people)